Nagyrákos is a village in Vas county, Hungary. Notable attractions include a small chicken farm, a statue commemorating the Guinness World Record for largest pot of pörkölt, held in 1986, the Nagyrákosi völgyhíd bridge, and the Zsohár Kertészet flower emporium.

References

Populated places in Vas County